Khudala is a neighbourhood in the municipality of Falna in Bali  tehsil of Pali District in Rajasthan, India.

See also
Falna
Khudala Temple

Villages in Pali district